Carol Whitaker (born June 30, 1982 in Saint John, New Brunswick as Carol Webb) is a Canadian curler.

Career
Whitaker played for New Brunswick at the 1999 Canada Games, finishing in 10th place.

Whitaker played in three straight Canadian Junior Curling Championships from 2001 to 2003, all for different provinces. In 2001 she played third for Sylvie Robichaud on Team New Brunswick She was then asked to be the fifth on the Prince Edward Island team that went on to win the World Juniors. In 2002, she played second for Suzanne Gaudet on Team Prince Edward Island. This team won the Junior championship that year and followed it up with a bronze medal at the 2002 World Junior Curling Championships. In 2003 she played third for Jennifer Guzzwell on Team Newfoundland and Labrador.

After juniors, Whitaker played in New Brunswick with Kathy Floyd and then with Sandy Comeau. In 2006, she was reunited with the Suzanne Gaudet team in Prince Edward Island. This team, which was the same as the National junior championship winning team in 2002 won the Prince Edward Island provincial championship in 2007 winning them the right to represent the province at the 2007 Scotties Tournament of Hearts. 2007 would mark Whitaker's first Hearts.

After Whitaker's second trip to the Scotties in two years and posting an impressive 83% she is returning to New Brunswick. Despite the excellent showing at the Scotties her team went a lackluster 3–8.

In 2008, Whitaker left the Gaudet team, and PEI to curl second for Rebecca Atkinson in New Brunswick. She joined up with Comeau once again in 2011.

Personal life
Carol married Patrick Whitaker in October 2009 to become Carol Whitaker.

References

1982 births
Curlers from Newfoundland and Labrador
Curlers from Prince Edward Island
Curlers from New Brunswick
Living people
Sportspeople from Saint John, New Brunswick
Canadian women curlers
Canada Cup (curling) participants